

Portugal
Angola – Nicolau Aberu Castelo Branco, Governor of Angola (1823–1829)

Spanish Empire

Captaincy General of Cuba – Francisco Dionisio Vives, Governor of Cuba (1823–1832)
Captaincy General of Puerto Rico – Miguel de la Torre y Pando, conde de Torrepando, Governor of Puerto Rico (1822–1837)
Spanish East Indies – 
Juan Antonio Martínez, Governor-General of the Philippines (1822–1825) 
Mariano Ricafort Palacín y Abarca, Governor-General of the Philippines (1825–1830)
Viceroyalty of Peru – Juan Pío de Tristán y Moscoso, nominal (1824–1826)

United Kingdom
 Malta Colony – Francis Rawdon-Hastings, Governor of Malta (1824–1826)
Mombasa – J. B. Emery, Governor of Mombasa (1824–1826)
New South Wales
 Major-General Thomas Brisbane, Governor of New South Wales (1821–1825)
 Lieutenant-General Ralph Darling, Governor of New South Wales (1825–1831)

Colonial governors
Colonial governors
1825